Sinatra at the Movies is a 2008 compilation album by Frank Sinatra.

Track listing
 "(Love Is) The Tender Trap" [From "The Tender Trap"] (Sammy Cahn, Jimmy Van Heusen) - 2:58
 "From Here to Eternity" [From "From Here to Eternity"] (Freddy Karger, Robert Wells)  -  2:59
 "I Love Paris" [From "Can-Can"] (Cole Porter) - 1:50
 "How Deep Is the Ocean?" [From "Meet Danny Wilson (film)"] (Irving Berlin) - 3:14
 "I Could Write a Book" [From "Pal Joey"] (Richard Rodgers, Lorenz Hart) - 3:53
 "All the Way" [From "The Joker is Wild"] (Cahn, Van Heusen) - 2:52
 "Young at Heart" [From "Young at Heart"] (Carolyn Leigh, Johnny Richards) - 2:50
 "Not as a Stranger" [From "Not as a Stranger"] (Van Heusen, Buddy Kaye) - 2:46
 "All of Me" [From "Meet Danny Wilson"] (Gerald Marks, Seymour Simons) - 2:08
 "High Hopes" [From "A Hole in the Head"] (Cahn, Van Heusen) - 2:41
 "The Lady Is a Tramp" [From "Pal Joey"] (Rodgers, Hart) - 3:15
 "Monique" [From "Kings Go Forth"] (Cahn, Elmer Bernstein) - 3:17
 "Chicago (That Toddlin' Town)" [From "The Joker Is Wild"] (Fred Fisher) - 2:12
 "Three Coins in the Fountain" [From "Three Coins in the Fountain"] (Jule Styne, Cahn) - 3:06
 "I Believe" [From "It Happened in Brooklyn"] (Ervin Drake, Irvin Graham, Jimmy Shirl, Al Stillman) - 2:31
 "Johnny Concho Theme (Wait For Me)" [From "Johnny Concho"] (Nelson Riddle, Jo Stafford) - 2:51
 "C'est Magnifique" [From "Can-Can"] (Porter) - 2:01
 "I Couldn't Sleep a Wink Last Night" [From "Higher and Higher"] (Harold Adamson, Jimmy McHugh) - 3:25
 "Just One of Those Things" [From "Young at Heart"] (Porter) - 3:15
 "To Love and Be Loved" [From "Some Came Running"] (Cahn, Van Heusen) - 2:55

Frank Sinatra compilation albums
2008 compilation albums
Soundtrack compilation albums